The Nepalese Journal of Ophthalmology is a biannual peer-reviewed medical journal on ophthalmology. It was established in 2009 and is the official journal of the Nepal Ophthalmic Society. It is abstracted and indexed in Index Medicus/MEDLINE/PubMed. It publishes original articles, case reports, review articles, and letters to the editor. The editor-in-chief is Eli Pradhan (Tilganga Institute of Ophthalmology, Kathmandu, Nepal).

External links 
 
 Journal page at website of the International Network for the Availability of Scientific Publications
 Print: 
 Online: 

Ophthalmology journals
Biannual journals
Publications established in 2009
English-language journals